The Czech Social Democratic Party (ČSSD) leadership election of 2001 was held on 7 April 2001. Prime Minister of the Czech Republic and incumbent leader Miloš Zeman decided to not seek re-election. Vladimír Špidla was elected his successor. Špidla was the only candidate.

552 delegates were allowed to vote. 543 of them voted. Špidla received 485 votes.

Voting

References

Czech Social Democratic Party leadership elections
Social Democratic Party leadership election
Single-candidate elections
Indirect elections
Czech Social Democratic Party leadership election
Czech Social Democratic Party leadership election